Bálint Nyilasi (born 20 March 1990 in Budapest) is a Hungarian football player. He plays for Csákvári TK.
He played his first league match in 2012. He is the son of Tibor Nyilasi, a retired international football player.

Club statistics

Updated to games played as of 1 December 2013.

References

External links
MLSZ 

1990 births
Living people
Footballers from Budapest
Hungarian footballers
Association football forwards
Ferencvárosi TC footballers
Soproni VSE players
Nemzeti Bajnokság I players
Association football midfielders